Richa Panai is an actress who appears in Bollywood, Tollywood, Mollywood and various ads.  Richa Panai came to prominence as a model in advertisements for the Indian jewellery company Bhima Jewellery.

Career
Richa was brought up in Lucknow. Since her school days, she wanted to be an actress. After completing her 12th Standard she won the Miss Lucknow title after which she decided to get into modelling. However, initial days of modelling was a struggle.

After she did a correspondence course and graduated from Delhi University, she became an air hostess with Kingfisher Airlines. Jabbar Kalarakkal gave her first ad film. She starred in a few Malayalam ads and soon, she made her film debut too.

She made her debut in the 2011 Malayalam film Vaadamalli. In the same year, she starred in two other Malayalam films, Bangkok Summer and Sandwich opposite Unni Mukundan and Kunchako Boban respectively. Richa won the Asianet Film Awards for Best New Face of the Year '12 (Female).

She was next seen with Allari Naresh in her first Telugu film Yamudiki Mogudu. She made her debut in Kannada film industry in 2015 and was cast along with Golden Star Ganesh in Buguri. She made her Bollywood debut with Traffic. Ensemble cast of Manoj Bajpayee, Jimmy Shergill, Divya Dutta and others. She was also seen in Telugu movie, Eedu Gold Ehe, starring Sunil.

She also filmed a multi cast Malayalam movie Crossroad (Lakehouse) that hit theaters in 2017.

Filmography

References

External links
 

Living people
Female models from Uttar Pradesh
Actresses in Telugu cinema
Actresses in Malayalam cinema
Indian film actresses
21st-century Indian actresses
Actresses from Lucknow
Actresses in Kannada cinema
Actresses in Hindi cinema
Year of birth missing (living people)